Thermochromatium is a Gram-negative and thermophilic genus of bacteria from the family of Chromatiaceae with one known species (Thermochromatium tepidum). The habitats of Thermochromatium tepidum are hot springs which contain sulfide.  Thermochromatium tepidum was first isolated from the Mammoth Hot Springs from the Yellowstone National Park in the United States.

References

Further reading 
 
 
 
 
 

Chromatiales
Bacteria genera
Monotypic bacteria genera
Taxa described in 1998